The 1996 Harlow District Council election took place on 2 May 1996 to elect members of Harlow District Council in Essex, England. This was on the same day as other local elections. The Labour Party retained control of the council, which it had held continuously since the council's creation in 1973.

Election result

All comparisons in vote share are to the corresponding 1992 election.

Ward results

Brays Grove

Great Parndon

Hare Street and Town Centre

Kingsmoor

Latton Bush (2 seats)

Little Parndon

Mark Hall South

Netteswell East

Netteswell West

Old Harlow (2 seats)

Passmores

Potter Street

Stewards

Tye Green

By-elections between 1996 and 1998

Great Parndon

Latton Bush

Mark Hall South

References

1996
1996 English local elections